7 Years and 50 Days is the second album of the German Euro-trance band Groove Coverage, released in 2004. Several versions of the album were released, most significant being the 'second edition' (or the 'limited edition'), which replaced "Fragezeichen" with "She" and included a bonus track as well as a thong looking like that worn by the girl on the cover of the band's single God Is A Girl. Other versions differ from country to country.

Track listing
"Poison" – 3:05
"7 Years and 50 Days (Radio Edit)" – 3:45
"Remember" – 3:18
"Runaway" – 3:05
"I Need You vs. I Need You" – 5:41
"The End" – 3:38
"Force of Nature" – 3:06
"When Life" – 4:05
"Home" – 3:17
"7 Years and 50 Days" (Album Version) – 3:18
"Can't Get Over You" – 3:24
"The End" (Special D Remix) – 3:45
"Not Available" – 4:40
"??? – Fragezeichen" – 3:50 (translation: Question Marks) (first edition track) / "She" (second edition track)"God Is a Girl" (second edition bonus track) – 3:37Note: "Fragezeichen" is the early version of "She" with no lyrics.''

Chart positions

Singles
"The End" (2003)
"Poison" (2003)
"7 Years and 50 Days" (2004)
"Runaway" (2004)
"She" (2004)

Videos
"Poison"
"The End"
"7 Years and 50 Days"
"Runaway"
"She"

References

Groove Coverage albums
2004 albums